American Whip is the second album by the New York dream pop duo Joy Zipper released in 2002.

Track listing
All songs written by Vincent Cafiso, except where noted.

Critical reaction

The BBC's Richard Banks praised "charming melodies, heart-melting harmonies and hazy lo-fi guitars" forming "an intoxicating alt-pop nectar", noting a formula little-changed from their first album.  He also discerned a darker side beneath the "saccharine" surface.  Pitchfork rated it 7.5/10, calling it "engaging and sharply-drawn", rejecting deeper meanings.  IGN gave it 8.5/10.

Drowned in Sound scored it 5/10, saying "Joy Zipper are the type of band that think shrouding their songs in a sheet of sub-Kevin Shields drone, drugged-up affectations and bastardised Bacharach melodies makes their pedestrian pop sound urgent, vital and 'edgy.' It doesn't."  Uncut called it a new My Bloody Valentine album in all but name, scoring it 4/10.

References

2000 albums
Joy Zipper albums